The Rivière Écartée (English: Spread River) is a tributary of the Bras du Nord, flowing in the territory of the municipality of Saint-Raymond, in the Portneuf Regional County Municipality, in the administrative region of Capitale-Nationale, in Quebec, Canada.

The lower part of the Écartée river valley is mainly served by the rang Saguenay road which first goes north and branches west to serve the north shore of the Bras du Nord including the hamlet Pine Lake. Another secondary forest road goes up this small valley.

Forestry is the main economic activity in this sector; recreotourism activities, second.

The Spread area (except rapids) is generally frozen from early December to late March, but safe movement on the ice is generally from late December to early March. The water level of the river varies with the seasons and the precipitation; the spring flood occurs in March or April.

Geography 
The main hydrographic slopes neighboring the Écartée river are:
 north side: lac de la Bible, lac Couat, Talayarde River;
 east side: Talayarde river;
 south side: Bras du Nord;
 west side: Bras du Nord, rivière de la Roche Plate.

The Écartée river takes its source from a small unidentified forest lake.

This watercourse descends entirely in a small valley in a forest environment according to the following segments:
  south-west, up to a mountain stream (coming from the north-west);
  to the southwest in a small plain where a golf club is located, until its mouth.

Toponymy 
The toponym "Rivière Écartée" was registered on December 5, 1968 at the Place Names Bank of the Commission de toponymie du Québec.

Notes and references

Appendices

See also 
 Laurentides Wildlife Reserve
 Saint-Raymond
 Portneuf Regional County Municipality
 Capitale-Nationale
 Bras du Nord
 Sainte-Anne River (Mauricie)
 Zec Batiscan-Neilson
 List of rivers of Quebec

Rivers of Capitale-Nationale